The COVID-19 vaccination campaign in Bosnia and Herzegovina is a mass immunization campaign that was put in place by the Bosnian authorities in order to respond to the ongoing COVID-19 pandemic. It started on 12 February 2021.

As of 29 January 2022, 943,394 people have received the first dose, 846,080 people have received the second dose and 135,476 people have received the third dose.



Vaccines on order
There are five types of COVID-19 vaccines currently being used in Bosnia and Herzegovina. As of 25 January 2022, 3,948,830 vaccines doses have arrived to the country.

See also
COVID-19 pandemic in Bosnia and Herzegovina
Deployment of COVID-19 vaccines

References

COVID-19 pandemic in Bosnia and Herzegovina
Bosnia and Herzegovina
2021 in Bosnia and Herzegovina